Listed below are executive orders numbered 13489–13764 and presidential memoranda signed by United States President Barack Obama.  There are an additional 1186 presidential proclamations that are not included here, but some of which are on WikiSource. The signing statements made by President Obama during his time in office have been archived here.

Executive orders
Cumulative number of executive orders signed by Barack Obama

2009

2010

2011

2012

2013

2014

2015

2016

2017

Presidential memoranda

See also
List of executive actions by George W. Bush, EO #13198–13488 (2001–2009)
List of executive actions by Donald Trump, EO #13765–13984 (2017–2021)

References

External links
 Federal Archives
 US Presidential Actions - Archived White House site
 Federal Register

 Obama
executive actions,Obama
 
Executive actions